Lysosomal protein transmembrane 4 alpha is a protein that in humans is encoded by the LAPTM4A gene.

Function
This gene encodes a protein that has four predicted transmembrane domains. The function of this gene has not yet been determined; however, studies in the mouse homolog suggest a role in the transport of small molecules across endosomal and lysosomal membranes.

References

Further reading